Sidumo (Sdumo) Mbongeni Dlamini is a South African politician who has been a Member of Parliament (MP) for the African National Congress.

Ministerial roles 
Dlamini served as Deputy Minister of  Agriculture, Land Reform and Rural Development from 30 May 2019 to 5 August 2021.

He was also Deputy Minister of Small Business Development from 5 August 2021 until 6 March 2023.

References 

Living people
Members of the National Assembly of South Africa
African National Congress politicians
21st-century South African politicians
Politicians from KwaZulu-Natal
Year of birth missing (living people)